Elections to the London Borough of Lewisham council were held on 6 May 2010. The elections were won by the Labour Party, who achieved a landslide victory.

Summary of results

References

2010
2010 London Borough council elections
May 2010 events in the United Kingdom